FC Waidhofen/Ybbs are an Austrian association football who plays in the Austrian Regional League East.

History
The club was founded in 1921 and began a cooperation with LASK Linz on 16 May 2009, in the course of this, the cooperation included several players from LASK to move there to train with the Vastic individually trained and supervised team FC Waidhofen/Ybbs. The fullname of the club is FC Harreither Waidhofen an der Ybbs.

Current squad
As of December 2009.

Staff and board members

 Head coach: Ivica Vastić
 Co-Trainer: Walter Huemer
 Club doctor: Dr. Karl Frey Hofer
 Goalkeeper coach: Herbert Gundacker
 Physio: Gerald Demolsky & Daniela Wagner
 Groundsmen:Ludwig Maderthaner & Ernst Aichinger

Management
 President: Thomas Sykora
 Vice Chairman: Thomas Lenze
 Vice Chairman: Walter Prantner
 Secretary : Markus Leitner
 Deputy Secretary : Guenther Plank
 Treasurer: Roland Damberger
 Deputy Treasurer: Robert Grurl

Former Coach
 Heinz Thonhofer

References

External links
  Official Website

Association football clubs established in 1921
Waidhofen Ybbs, FC
1921 establishments in Austria